Health Beauty Life is a lifestyle media outlet that offers print, video, online, and emerging media with content about health, beauty, fashion, fitness, travel, and non-profit charity organizations, as well as other topics of interest. Founded by Publisher, Executive Producer, and Host Patrick Dockry, Health Beauty Life was established in 2010 in Oceanside, California.

Magazine 
Health Beauty Life Magazine is a quarterly lifestyle magazine that's nationally distributed in print and available globally through HealthBeautyLife.com. The print magazine has a distribution of 80,000, with 50,000 certified direct mail, and 30,000 hand delivered nationwide. It is distributed to salons, spas and medical professional waiting rooms nationwide, and can be found on the newsstands of various national retailers such as Barnes & Noble and Books-a-Million. The print magazine features interactive QR coded articles that correspond with television episodes and video elements on HealthBeautyLife.com. The magazine's total reach is over 10 million readers. Past issues of the publication can be found online at ISSUU on the Health Beauty Life Magazine page.

Online 
HealthBeautyLife.com is the companion site to Health Beauty Life Magazine, and network series, Health Beauty Life with Patrick Dockry.

Television 
Health Beauty Life with Patrick Dockry is a television series featuring a mix of celebrity interviews, getaway travel, healthy cooking, fitness, beauty, fashion, and lifestyle segments, all hosted by Producer, Patrick Dockry. This 13-episode, ½-hour weekly series formerly aired on WE tv and Tuff TV, and can now be found on the Family Channel. Local listing can be found at TV Guide.

References

External links
 

Lifestyle magazines published in the United States
Online magazines published in the United States
Quarterly magazines published in the United States
American travel television series
Lifestyle websites
Magazines established in 2010
Magazines published in California